Balambu is a village and former Village Development Committee that is now part of Chandragiri Municipality in Kathmandu District in Province No. 3 of central Nepal. At the time of the 2011 Nepal census it had a population of 7,323 and had 1,734 houses in it. Porters play a vital role in Nepal's tourism industry; every year they support thousands of tourists in tackling the iconic trails of the Everest region. Often climbing multiple time during the high season, the trekking industry provides an income that helps porters earn a living and support their families. However, they are also often the least valued on the mountain and because of the pressures to get an income can face exploitation and mistreatment from trekking  operators. To address these issues, Kathmandu Environmental Education Program (KEEP) has created the Porter Awareness and Welfare training program. This provides porters with information about their work rights as well as health, hygiene and general First Aid skills. The program also offers guidance on appropriate trekking clothing and gear, and how to access KEEP's Porter Clothing Centre, which loans warm clothing and appropriate footwear to porters.

Place to visit

Chandragiri Hills

Chandragiri Cable Car is a lift transportation system located in Kathmandu. Opened on 2016, the cable car runs from Thankot to Chandragiri Hills. The 2.4 km (9,095 ft) line has two stations. The cable car system consists of 38 gondolas. The Chandragiri Hills has Bhaleshwor Mahadev, one of the ancient temples which located in the hill above 2551 meters of sea level. Most of the tourists come to visit Thankot to visit Chandragiri Hills. The travelers are mostly from Kathmandu valley and outside of valley. It also promote tourism and helps the local livelihood. It also attracts foreign tourist. It costs 700 rupees for a round trip for locals and about $22 for foreigners.

Tribhuwan Park 
Tribhuwan Park is a park in Kathmandu. It is the most famous picnic destination inside Kathmandu Valley and on Saturdays is full picnic enjoying people. The rates to visit park is 40 rupees for local people with separate rates for picnics. The park was created to remember King Tribhuwan Bir Bikram Shaha Dev. It has plants of different species, gardens, and a view of the mountains and the valleys below.

Matatirtha Temple 
Matatirtha Temple is an iconic destination for religious tourism. It is located in Matatirtha. The word Matatirtha comes from two Sanskrit words, meaning "mother" and  meaning "sacred place". The VDC owes its name from a sacred pond in the VDC dedicated to mother. In Mother's day, people from different place visit temple because temple is delicated to mother and swim in the pond.

Language
The language of Balambu is Nepal Bhasa's Lalitpur dialect with a few informal changes.

References

Populated places in Kathmandu District